Hiro Takachiho is a character appearing in American comic books published by Marvel Comics. He first appeared in Sunfire & Big Hero 6 #1, and was created by Steven T. Seagle and Duncan Rouleau.

The character is known as Hiro Hamada and voiced by Ryan Potter in the Big Hero 6 film and television series and related media. He is a young robotics prodigy who helps form the superhero group Big Hero 6 to protect the city. The character is also changed to half Japanese and half Caucasian.

Publication history
Created by Steven T. Seagle and Duncan Rouleau in their spare time while working on another project, Hiro was first intended to appear with the rest of Big Hero 6 in Alpha Flight #17 (December 1998). However, the team first appeared in their own self-titled three-issue miniseries by writer Scott Lobdell and artist Gus Vasquez, which due to scheduling issues, was published before Alpha Flight #17. The character appeared with the team in a subsequent five-issue miniseries which was launched by Marvel Comics in September 2008.

Fictional character biography
Born to wealthy industrialist Tomeo Takachiho and Maemi Takachiho, Hiro was raised in the affluent Tokyo suburb of Yoga, City of Setagaya. His parents noticed his intellectual brilliance at an early age, and he was placed in pre-school at age 2. He was eventually recognized as one of the world's most brilliant child prodigies and was accepted into the prestigious private Tesuka Advanced Science Institute. It was at the Tesuka Institute that young Hiro's proficiency for invention and innovation was discovered. He created his first and greatest invention to date, the robotic synthformer known as Monster Baymax, as a project for the institute's science fair.

At age 13, Hiro was targeted by the Giri, a top-secret consortium of Japanese politicians and business entities that was established to recruit and train potential operatives for a Japanese super-team, Big Hero 6. Silver Samurai (Kenuichio Harada), Big Hero 6's initial field leader, first approached Hiro's mother for permission to have him join the team, but she refused as she wanted her child to live a normal life. Silver Samurai then approached Hiro directly, but the boy was less than impressed with Big Hero 6. However, after his mother was abducted by the Everwraith, the astral embodiment of all those killed in the 1945 nuclear attacks on Hiroshima and Nagasaki, Hiro was forced to turn to Big Hero 6 for assistance. After joining forces with the team, which also included his idol, the Japanese hero Sunfire, Hiro opted to join the team. In fact, when Silver Samurai and Sunfire left the Big Hero 6, Hiro was appointed to serve as the team's field leader. He continues to maintain a civilian life and attend classes at the Tesuka Institute, although his teachers and classmates are unaware that he moonlights as a secret agent.

Hiro idolizes Sunfire and has a crush on Honey Lemon.

Powers and abilities
Hiro is a brilliant child prodigy, proficient in many fields of science and technology, with a focus on biology, physics, and robotics. Although he is only an adolescent, he is a visionary theoretician and accomplished machinesmith who has already made several breakthroughs in fields such as robotics, computer science, synthetic polymers, geology, biology, and communications. He is also a gifted tactician and strategist.

Hiro has constructed several robots, his first and most advanced creation being Monster Baymax, a water-powered synthformer whose artificial intelligence is based on the thoughts and memories of his departed father. Other notable inventions include: the Bio-Atomic Parcel Detector (B-APD), a device capable of pinpointing the location of human-sized nuclear reactors; a jet-pack-propelled flight suit that grants its user limited firepower capabilities; a holographic virtual reality projector that can produce a comprehensive recreation of previous events by amassing information from various data streams; and eyeglasses with a cybernetic video display that can connect to an assortment of computer networks. Many of Hiro's inventions (including Monster Baymax) are connected to his Core Cyber Network (CCN), a mobile personal area computer network used for communication among his various mechanical devices.

Reception 
 In 2020, CBR.com ranked Hiro Takachiho 3rd in their "Marvel Comics: Ranking Every Member Of Big Hero 6 From Weakest To Most Powerful" list.

In other media

Film

In the film adaptation, Hiro, with his last name changed to Hamada and his ethnicity changed to being half White, half East Asian, appears in the 2014 Disney animated feature Big Hero 6, voiced by Ryan Potter. Speaking of the character, co-director Don Hall said "Hiro is transitioning from boy to man, it's a tough time for a kid and some teenagers develop that inevitable snarkiness and jaded attitude. Luckily Ryan is a very likeable kid. So no matter what he did, he was able to take edge off the character in a way that made him authentic, but appealing."

Hiro is a 14-year-old robotics prodigy whose battle robot dominates the underground bot fights of San Fransokyo. His older brother Tadashi, a student at the San Fransokyo Institute of Technology, inspires him to redirect his efforts toward gaining acceptance to its research program. After Tadashi is killed in a fire and explosion on the campus, Hiro becomes withdrawn and depressed. He later forms the Big Hero 6 team with Tadashi's fellow researchers and Baymax, an inflatable healthcare robot built by Tadashi, to stop Yokai, the villain who killed Tadashi by causing the fire.

Hiro initially lacks a social life and appears to suffer from intellectual boredom. After Tadashi's urging and meeting with his friends, he becomes more open and accepting to those around him and tries to be friendly. He also decides to be a hero out of necessity as opposed to being unwillingly forced into the occupation. He also wears purple armor that, by itself, serves absolutely no function besides protection. However, when paired with Baymax, the suit magnetizes to his back and allows Hiro to control him while flying.

Television
Hiro appears in Big Hero 6: The Series with Potter reprising the role. The first episode, "Baymax Returns" takes place during the last part of the movie where Hiro rebuilds Baymax. He suddenly gets embroiled in a plot involving his new professor's paperweight and his previous arch enemy, Yama. He is later given Tadashi's old lab room so that he can have a familiar environment to focus in.

In the episode "Issue 188", it is revealed that despite having a see through visor that reveals his face, some people still cannot tell that he is part of Big Hero 6, specifically Karmi, a fellow student who despises Hiro, but has a crush on his alter ego. Fred informs Hiro that the reason for this is simply that she "chooses" to see his alter ego as a hero and himself as an academic rival. Additionally, Aunt Cass is also unaware of his heroic endeavors and at one point thought that Hiro had returned to bot fighting when she saw through his lie of where he was.

In the episode "Muirahara Woods", Hiro is shown to be slightly agoraphobic admitting to Fred that he has never been outside of San Fransokyo. Furthermore, he is uncomfortable around nature and is afraid of bugs and insects. Out of all of his teammates, he has the least in common with Wasabi whom he had difficulty with due to his cleanliness. By the end of "Killer App", the two become closer.

Hiro is also shown to have updated his costume. His gloves now have the ability to magnetize and propel objects making him much more useful in a fight. In the episode "Kentucky Kaiju", he briefly invented a suit that granted him super strength called Nano-Dex, but he got rid of it when it became a hassle to use. In the same episode, Hiro is shown to possibly suffer from a variation of little man's syndrome as he hates constantly having to be saved by his older and more capable teammates.

In season two, it is revealed that Hiro somewhat envies other kids who grew up with normal childhoods. He befriends a girl named Megan Cruz who begins to treat him to common teenage outings; opening his eyes to new experiences. At the end of the season, he accepts Tadashi's diploma on his behalf.

In season three, he becomes closer with Karmi, with the implication that they both like one another. He also inadvertently gets assigned to be a mentor to a student named Rishi Patel who is younger than he was when he started attending SFIT.

Hiro appears in the Disney+ spin-off series Baymax! with Potter reprising the role. In the episode "Yachi", it is implied that he has taken up playing soccer, while in the follow up episode "Baymax", he is shown to have improved the microbots technology, altering the controls from a headband to a small chip that can easily be stuck onto his temple.

Video games
Hiro appears in Disney Infinity: Marvel Super Heroes and Disney Infinity 3.0, based on his 2014 film appearance.

Hiro appeared in Kingdom Hearts III with the rest of Big Hero 6.

References

External links
 Hiro Takachiho at Marvel Wiki
 Hiro Takachiho at Comic Vine
 UncannyXmen.net Character Profile on Hiro & Baymax

Big Hero 6 characters
Characters created by Steven T. Seagle
Child characters in animated films
Comics characters introduced in 1998
Fictional child prodigies
Fictional college students
Fictional Japanese people in television
Fictional inventors
Fictional roboticists
Fictional secret agents and spies
Japanese superheroes
Marvel Comics child superheroes
Marvel Comics male superheroes
Marvel Comics scientists
Superhero film characters
Teenage characters in comics
Teenage characters in film
Teenage superheroes